A biochron (from the Greek bios, life; and khronos, time) is the length of time represented by a biostratigraphic zone.  Biochrons are named after characteristic fossil organisms or taxa that characterise that interval in time.

References
North American Mammalian Time Scale Retrieved June 18, 2007

Notes

Biochronology